Mark Byington (born April 22, 1976) is an American basketball coach and former college basketball player. He is the head men's basketball coach at James Madison University.

High school playing career
Mark Byington played high school basketball at Salem High School located in Salem, Virginia. He led the Salem Spartans coached by current Dobyns-Bennett head coach Charlie Morgan to a 26–1 record in the 1993–94 season and to the Group AA state championship defeating Louisa County. His #32 jersey has since been retired by Salem High School along with #11 Richard Morgan, who was an All-American.

College playing career
Byington was a three-year starter for the UNC Wilmington basketball team. He was awarded 2nd-team All-Colonial Athletic Association and All-CAA Defensive Team honors his senior year. In his four years at UNCW, he was a two-time CAA All-Academic selection and scored more than 1,000 points during his career.

Coaching career
Byington spent nine seasons as an assistant coach at the College of Charleston, including seven as Bobby Cremins’ top assistant. The College of Charleston compiled a record of 194–100 and a 108–51 record in the Southern Conference during the years when Byington was an assistant coach. During those seasons, they also recorded six 20-win seasons, logged three Southern Conference South Division regular-season titles, advanced to the league's tournament championship game three times and made two appearances in the NIT.

After a one year assistant coaching stop at Virginia Tech, Byington was hired as the head coach at Georgia Southern. In seven seasons with the Eagles, he guided them to a 131–97 overall record, with three-straight 20-win seasons in his final three seasons. On March 20, 2020, Byington was named the 11th head coach in James Madison history, replacing Louis Rowe.

Head coaching record

*Byington served as interim head coach after Bobby Cremins took a medical leave of absence.

References

1976 births
Living people
American men's basketball players
Basketball coaches from Virginia
Basketball players from Virginia
College men's basketball head coaches in the United States
College of Charleston Cougars men's basketball coaches
Georgia Southern Eagles men's basketball coaches
James Madison Dukes men's basketball coaches
Salem High School (Salem, Virginia) alumni
UNC Wilmington Seahawks men's basketball players

Virginia Cavaliers men's basketball coaches
Virginia Tech Hokies men's basketball coaches